The Byodo-In Temple (Byōdōin Tenpuru) is a non-denominational Buddhist temple located on the island of Oahu in Hawaii in Valley of the Temples Memorial Park.  It was dedicated in August 1968 to commemorate the 100th anniversary of the first Japanese immigrants to Hawaii. 

The temple is a replica of a 900-year-old Buddhist temple at Uji in Kyoto Prefecture of Japan. Contrary to popular belief, it is not a functioning Buddhist temple in the proper sense as it does not host a resident monastic community nor an active congregation. Inside the Byodo-In Temple is a  statue of the Lotus Buddha, a wooden image depicting Amitābha. It is covered in gold and lacquer. Outside is a three-ton, brass peace bell. Around those ponds are lush Japanese gardens set against a backdrop of towering cliffs of the Koʻolau Range. The gardens are home to sparrows and peafowl.

The Byodo-In Temple is visited and used by thousands of worshipers from around the world.  It welcomes people of all faiths to participate in its traditions. Apart from worship, the temple grounds are also used for weddings and office meetings.

Ancient Japan
Byodo-In Temple is a smaller-scale replica of the Byōdō-in, a World Heritage Site near the ancient city of Kyoto, originally a monastery founded by Fujiwara no Yorimichi in 1052 of the Heian period.  It was famous for its Vairocana statue.  The statue was lost and replaced in 1053 with a large wooden statue of Amitābha, a national treasure carved by the Japanese artisan Jōchō.

It is called the "Phoenix Hall" in English in reference to the two fenghuang birds stretching their wings upon the temple roof. Fifty two wooden images of bodhisattvas surround Amitābha, dancing and playing musical instruments on floating clouds.

From 2001 to 2007, the temple underwent restoration in the spirit of preservation of Japan's ancient heritage.

Modern Hawaii

Byodo-In Temple was commissioned and built largely by concrete (the original is wooden without the use of nails) in 1968 at its present location in the Valley of the Temples to celebrate the centennial anniversary of the arrival of Japanese culture to Hawaii.  It was dedicated by Governor John A. Burns, a favorite of the Japanese community for his long service for the cause of Japanese rights during the state's territorial years.  Japanese immigrants entered the Kingdom of Hawaii and later Territory of Hawaii to labor in the sugarcane and pineapple plantations.  They joined the Chinese, Filipino, Korean, native Hawaiians and Portuguese.

Valley of the Temples Memorial Park

The Valley of the Temples Memorial Park, where the Byodo-in Temple is located, also contains large Catholic statues depicting the Passion of Christ, the Virgin Mary, various Catholic saints, crypts and mausoleums of some of the most influential people in Hawaiʻi. Most notable of those interred at the mausoleums of the Valley of the Temples is Walter F. Dillingham, Hawaii entrepreneur and statesman. For a time, former Philippine President Ferdinand E. Marcos was interred at a private mausoleum overlooking the Byodo-In temple. Thousands of Buddhist, Shinto, Protestant and Catholic residents of Hawaii are buried in this memorial park. It was founded by Paul Trousdale in 1963.

In popular culture
The TV series Hawaii Five-O and Magnum, P.I. featured several episodes where the temple is incorporated into the plot. The temple and its vicinity also served as a stand-in for South Korea in one episode of the ABC series Lost and as the Presidential Villa in an episode of seaQuest DSV.

The temple was also used in the 2001 movie Pearl Harbor as a replica of the Byodo-In Temple in Japan as well as several other movies.

Gallery

References

External links

 Temple website
 Three-dimensional rendering of Byodo-In (without plugin; in English, Spanish, German)

1968 in the United States
Buddhist temples in Hawaii
Hawaiian architecture
Japanese-American culture in Hawaii
Japanese gardens in the United States
Religious buildings and structures completed in 1968
Religious buildings and structures in Honolulu County, Hawaii
20th-century Buddhist temples